David Murray Dryden (September 5, 1941 – October 4, 2022) was a Canadian professional ice hockey goaltender, who created and first used the modern goaltending mask, consisting of fibreglass and a cage. From 1962 to 1980, he played nine seasons in the National Hockey League for the New York Rangers, Chicago Black Hawks, Buffalo Sabres, and Edmonton Oilers, and in the World Hockey Association between 1974 and 1979 with the Chicago Cougars and Edmonton Oilers, as well as for other smaller teams in other minor leagues.

Early life
Dryden was born in Hamilton, Ontario, on September 5, 1941.  His father, Murray, worked as a brick salesman and became a philanthropist; his mother, Margaret (Campbell), was a kindergarten teacher.  He was the older brother of Ken Dryden. Dryden began his junior career with the Aurora Bears in 1958, before playing two seasons for the St. Michael's Majors of the Ontario Hockey Association (OHA).  He then joined the Toronto Marlboros in 1961.

Professional career
Dryden played in the National Hockey League (NHL) and World Hockey Association (WHA) from 1962 to 1979, playing for the New York Rangers, Buffalo Sabres, Chicago Black Hawks, Chicago Cougars, and Edmonton Oilers. He made his NHL debut on February 3, 1962, with the Rangers, serving as an emergency backup for Gump Worsley. On March 20, 1971, in a game between his Sabres and the Montreal Canadiens, Dryden faced his brother Ken, the first time in the history of the NHL that brothers opposed each other as goalies. The brothers met again five more times.

Dryden's best years came in the WHA, while playing for the Oilers. Of all the Oilers' goaltenders during their membership in the WHA, he played the most games (197) and earned the most wins (94). He was the goalie against whom Wayne Gretzky scored his first professional goalduring Gretzky's short stint with the Indianapolis Racers, before quickly becoming Dryden's teammate with the Oilers. Dryden won the Ben Hatskin Trophy as the WHA's top goaltender and the Gordie Howe Trophy as league MVP in 1979.  Two years prior, Dryden designed the first mask-cage combination goalie mask; maskmaker Greg Harrison transferred his design drawings into a final product which Dryden wore for the Oilers. The mask is on display at the Hockey Hall of Fame in Toronto. The mask-cage combination goalie mask is now the norm in modern hockey.

Personal life
Dryden was married to Sandra for 59 years until his death. Together, they had two children. He was the brother of Ken Dryden. He was the chair person of Sleeping Children Around the World charity (founded by his father) which provides bed kits to children in developing countries.

Dryden died on October 4, 2022, at the age of 81, from complications following a surgery for chronic thromboembolic pulmonary hypertension. Sleeping Children Around the World and the National Hockey League announced that they would be launching a donation initiative in his name to provide bed kits to children in developing countries.

Career statistics

Regular season and playoffs

References

External links
 

1941 births
2022 deaths
Buffalo Bisons (AHL) players
Buffalo Sabres players
Canadian expatriate ice hockey players in the United States
Canadian ice hockey coaches
Canadian ice hockey goaltenders
Canadian people of Scottish descent
Chicago Blackhawks players
Chicago Cougars players
Dallas Black Hawks players
Detroit Red Wings coaches
Edmonton Oilers (WHA) players
Edmonton Oilers coaches
Edmonton Oilers players
Ice hockey people from Ontario
New York Rangers players
Ontario Hockey Association Senior A League (1890–1979) players
Peterborough Petes coaches
Rochester Americans players
Salt Lake Golden Eagles (WHL) players
Sportspeople from Hamilton, Ontario
Toronto Marlboros players
Toronto St. Michael's Majors players